Philip Drury Dawson (born January 23, 1975) is a former American football placekicker. He played in the National Football League (NFL) for the Cleveland Browns from 1999 to 2012 and holds their franchise record for most field goals made, passing Hall of Famer Lou Groza in 2010. He played college football at Texas. He also played for the San Francisco 49ers from 2013-2016, and the Arizona Cardinals in 2017 and 2018. He signed a contract in 2019 to retire as a member of the team that he started with, the Cleveland Browns.

High school career
Dawson attended Lake Highlands High School in Dallas, Texas and was a letterman in football. In a 1992 playoff game at Texas Stadium against Nacogdoches High School, Dawson kicked a 52-yard field goal as time expired to beat Nacogdoches 31-28. He graduated in the class of 1993; the Baltimore Ravens placekicker Matt Stover attended the same high school, graduating in 1986. As a senior, he was a starter at both kicker and offensive tackle until he hurt his knee in a preseason scrimmage. He thought he might have to have season-ending surgery, but he gutted it out, stuck to kicking, and was named as an All-American and the Southwest Region Offensive Player of the Year by SuperPrep.

College career
Dawson attended the University of Texas at Austin, where he was a four-year letterman in football. After redshirting his freshman year, he scored 80 points his first year of playing. He also tied a school record with 54 consecutive extra points. The following season, he made honorary All-America honors while leading the Longhorns in scoring. He made first-team All-America his junior and senior years, while simultaneously making All-Big 12. He earned a B.A. in political science. Dawson is famous for his 1995 game-winning field goal against the University of Virginia, booting a 50-yarder against a 30-MPH wind to give Texas a dramatic 17-16 victory as time expired.

Professional career
Dawson was signed as an undrafted free agent by the Oakland Raiders, who then waived him. He was picked up by the New England Patriots and assigned to the practice squad, but never appeared in a game for them.

Cleveland Browns

The Cleveland Browns signed him as a free agent in March 1999, and he remained with the team for 14 years until he joined the San Francisco 49ers in 2013. (He was the only player left from the 1999 Browns squad). Dawson holds the Browns record for most consecutive field goals made (29) and most field goals in a game (6). Dawson is currently the 7th most accurate kicker in the NFL. On October 10, 2010, Dawson tied Lou Groza for the Browns' career field-goal record with 234.

Dawson scored the first points in the history of the "new" Cleveland Browns in 1999. On October 10 of that year, he scored the only touchdown of his career on a fake field goal against the Bengals in an 18-17 loss.

On November 17, 2008, Dawson hit a 56-yard field game-winning field goal against the Buffalo Bills on Monday Night Football.

Dawson would have become an unrestricted free agent at the end of the 2010 season, but he was given the franchise tag on February 22, keeping him for the 2011 season.

San Francisco 49ers

Dawson signed with the San Francisco 49ers on March 19, 2013. He made 27 consecutive field goals during the 2013 season, until the streak was snapped by a 24-yard field goal miss against the Arizona Cardinals in Week 17. He finished his first year in San Francisco with the second-most points (140) and field goals (32-of-36) in the team's history. Dawson kicked the game-winning field goal in the 49ers Wild Card playoff game against the Green Bay Packers on January 5, 2014, giving the 49ers a 23-20 victory.

On September 26, 2013, Dawson attempted and missed a 71-yard fair catch kick in the last seconds of the second quarter of a game against the St. Louis Rams.

On March 11, 2014, Dawson signed a new two-year contract to remain with the 49ers.

Dawson re-signed with the 49ers on a one-year contract on March 12, 2016. He made his 400th career field goal on November 20, 2016 against the Patriots.

Arizona Cardinals
On March 10, 2017, Dawson signed a two-year contract with the Arizona Cardinals.

On September 10, 2017, in the season opening 35–23 loss to the Detroit Lions, Dawson made his debut as a Cardinal. He converted two extra points and a field goal in the loss.

On September 17, 2017,  Dawson converted three field goals, including a 40-yarder to force overtime and a 30-yarder in overtime to win, in the 16–13 victory over the Indianapolis Colts.

On November 26, 2017,  Dawson hit a 57-yard field goal with one second left to beat the favored Jacksonville Jaguars. It was the longest made field goal of Dawson's career (although he made a 59-yard field goal during a 2010 preseason game with the Browns). He converted four field goals in the game, including the 57-yard game-winner, earning him NFC Special Teams Player of the Week.

Dawson became the 11th player in NFL history to appear in 300 career games.

On November 26, 2018, Dawson was placed on injured reserve with a hip injury.

Retirement 
Dawson announced his retirement after 21 seasons on August 1, 2019, after signing a one-day ceremonial contract with the Browns to retire as a member of the team. After Dawson's retirement, Adam Vinatieri became the sole remaining active player from the 1990s.

NFL career statistics

The "Phil Dawson Rule"
Dawson had a rule named after him after a missed call by referees. On November 18, 2007, Dawson attempted a 51-yard field goal in the closing seconds of the fourth quarter to tie the game against the Baltimore Ravens. The kick carried through the air and hit the left upright, then over the crossbar (through the uprights, like any good field goal) and then hit the rear curved support post (stanchion) that holds the crossbar, then bounced back over the crossbar (through the uprights again, but backwards this time) into the end zone in front of the goalpost. The kick was originally ruled no good. Under NFL rules, the play was not reviewable. Officials discussed the play among themselves for several minutes and decided that, since the ball had indeed crossed the crossbar within the goal, whatever happened afterward to the ball did not matter. The kick was considered good, as announced by referee Pete Morelli. However, as the play is not technically reviewable, referee Pete Morelli announced that the play was reversed "after discussion," as opposed to "after further review," as is usually stated. At this point the Ravens, already celebrating in the locker room (they would have won 30-27 if the field goal was no good), were called back out onto the field to proceed to an overtime period. The Browns went on to win the game, 33-30 in overtime, as Dawson came through again with a more visible 33-yard field goal. Dawson finished 4 for 5 in FGs, whereas fellow Lake Highlands High School alumnus Matt Stover finished 3 for 3 in FGs for the Ravens.

Notably, later in the season on December 16, in driving snow and wind gusts up to 40 mph, Dawson kicked another field goal, an improbable 49-yarder, that hit the same center support post. This field goal helped the Browns achieve an 8-0 win over the Buffalo Bills in blizzard conditions. Hitting this same structure twice in the same season has led some members of the Cleveland press to begin referring to the support post as "The Dawson Bar."

Prior to the 2008 season, the rule was changed to allow field goal and extra point attempts that hit the uprights or crossbar to be reviewed. This new rule is dubbed the "Phil Dawson Rule."

Personal life
Dawson resides in Nashville, Tennessee with his wife, Shannon, and 3 children, Dru, Beau, and Sophiann. Dru was the starting quarterback at Vandegrift High School. Dru graduated in 2020. Beau plays football at Lipscomb Academy High School . Dawson kicks right-footed but throws left-handed. His wife Shannon is a singer-songwriter and produced her first album "Redemption" in 2013.

On March 6, 2020, Dawson was named special teams coordinator at Lipscomb Academy in Nashville.

References

External links

Phil Dawson Edge
49ers Player Bio

1975 births
Living people
Sportspeople from Palm Beach, Florida
American football placekickers
Texas Longhorns football players
Oakland Raiders players
New England Patriots players
Cleveland Browns players
San Francisco 49ers players
Arizona Cardinals players
Players of American football from Dallas
American Conference Pro Bowl players
Ed Block Courage Award recipients